The Edinburgh Chess Club  was founded in 1822 and is the oldest continually existing Chess club in Scotland and second oldest in the world.

See also

References

External links

Chess clubs in the United Kingdom
Sports teams in Edinburgh
1822 establishments in Scotland
Sports clubs established in the 1820s
Clubs and societies in Edinburgh